The following outline is provided as an overview of and topical guide to Greece:

Greece – sovereign country located on the southern end of the Balkan Peninsula in Southern Europe.  Greece borders Albania, Bulgaria, and North Macedonia to the north, and Turkey to the east. The Aegean Sea lies to the east and south of mainland Greece, while the Ionian Sea lies to the west. Both parts of the Eastern Mediterranean basin feature a vast number of islands.

Greece lies at the juncture of Europe, Asia and Africa. It is heir to the heritages of ancient Greece, the Roman and Byzantine Empires, and nearly four centuries of Ottoman rule. Greece is the birthplace of democracy, Western philosophy, the Olympic Games (for this reason, unless it is the host nation, it always leads the Parade of Nations in accordance with tradition begun at the 1928 Amsterdam Olympics), Western literature and historiography, political science, major scientific and mathematical principles, and Western drama including both tragedy and comedy.

Greece is a developed country, a member of the European Union since 1981, a member of the Economic and Monetary Union of the European Union since 2001, NATO since 1952, the OECD since 1961, the WEU since 1995 and ESA since 2005. Athens is the capital; Thessaloniki, Patras, Heraklion, Volos, Ioannina, Larissa and Kavala are some of the country's other major cities.

General reference

 Pronunciation: 
 Common English country name: Greece
 Official English country name: The Hellenic Republic
 Common endonym(s):   (Ellas, archaic);  (Ellada)
 Official endonym(s):   (Elliniki Dimokratia)
 Adjectives:  Greek, Grecian, Hellenic
 Demonym:  Greek
 Etymology: Name of Greece
 International rankings of Greece
 ISO country codes: GR, GRC, 300
 ISO region codes: See ISO 3166-2:GR
 Internet country code top-level domain: .gr

Geography of Greece 

Geography of Greece
 Greece is: a country
 Location:
 Northern Hemisphere and Eastern Hemisphere
 Eurasia
 Europe
 Southern Europe
 Balkans (also known as "Southeastern Europe")
 Western Europe
 Time zone:  Eastern European Time (UTC+02), Eastern European Summer Time (UTC+03)
 Extreme points of Greece
 High:  Mount Olympus 
 Low:  Mediterranean Sea 0 m
 Land boundaries:  1,228 km
 494 km
 282 km
 246 km
 206 km
 Coastline:  13,676 km
 Population of Greece: 11,306,183 	(January 1, 2010)  - 73rd most populous country

 Area of Greece: 131,990 km2
 Atlas of Greece

Environment of Greece 

Environment of Greece
 Climate of Greece
 Environmental issues in Greece
 Renewable energy in Greece
 Protected areas of Greece
 National parks of Greece
 Wildlife of Greece
 Fauna of Greece
 Birds of Greece
 Mammals of Greece

Natural geographic features of Greece 

 Caves in Greece
 Islands of Greece
 Lakes of Greece
 Mountains of Greece
 Volcanoes in Greece
 Rivers of Greece
 List of World Heritage Sites in Greece

Regions of Greece

Ecoregions of Greece 

List of ecoregions in Greece

Administrative divisions of Greece 
Administrative divisions of Greece
 Administrative regions of Greece
 Regional units of Greece
 Municipalities of Greece

Administrative regions of Greece 

Modern regions of Greece

Regional units of Greece 

Regional units of Greece

Municipalities of Greece 

Municipalities and communities of Greece
 Capital of Greece: Athens (outline)
 Cities of Greece

Traditional geographic divisions of Greece

Traditional geographic divisions of Greece

Demography of Greece 
Demographics of Greece
 Demographic history of Greece

Government and politics of Greece 
Politics of Greece
 Form of government: parliamentary representative democratic republic
 Capital of Greece: Athens
 Elections in Greece
Next Greek legislative election
 Greek government-debt crisis
Greek government-debt crisis timeline
Greek austerity packages
 Greek withdrawal from the eurozone
 Political parties in Greece
 Taxation in Greece
Tax evasion and corruption in Greece

Branches of the government of Greece 

Government of Greece

Executive branch of the government of Greece 
 Head of state: President of Greece, Katerina Sakellaropoulou
 Head of government: Prime Minister of Greece, Kyriakos Mitsotakis
 Cabinet of Greece

Legislative branch of the government of Greece 

 Hellenic Parliament (unicameral)

Judicial branch of the government of Greece 

Judicial system of Greece
There are three Supreme Courts in Greece. They are:

 Court of Cassation
 Council of State
 Chamber of Accounts

Foreign relations of Greece 

Foreign relations of Greece
 Diplomatic missions in Greece
 Diplomatic missions of Greece

International organization membership 
The Hellenic Republic is a member of:

Australia Group
Bank for International Settlements (BIS)
Black Sea Economic Cooperation Zone (BSEC)
Council of Europe (CE)
Economic and Monetary Union (EMU)
Euro-Atlantic Partnership Council (EAPC)
European Bank for Reconstruction and Development (EBRD)
European Investment Bank (EIB)
European Organization for Nuclear Research (CERN)
European Space Agency (ESA)
European Union (EU)
Food and Agriculture Organization (FAO)
International Atomic Energy Agency (IAEA)
International Bank for Reconstruction and Development (IBRD)
International Chamber of Commerce (ICC)
International Civil Aviation Organization (ICAO)
International Criminal Court (ICCt)
International Criminal Police Organization (Interpol)
International Development Association (IDA)
International Energy Agency (IEA)
International Federation of Red Cross and Red Crescent Societies (IFRCS)
International Finance Corporation (IFC)
International Fund for Agricultural Development (IFAD)
International Hydrographic Organization (IHO)
International Labour Organization (ILO)
International Maritime Organization (IMO)
International Mobile Satellite Organization (IMSO)
International Monetary Fund (IMF)
International Olympic Committee (IOC)
International Organization for Migration (IOM)
International Organization for Standardization (ISO)
International Red Cross and Red Crescent Movement (ICRM)
International Telecommunication Union (ITU)
International Telecommunications Satellite Organization (ITSO)

International Trade Union Confederation (ITUC)
Inter-Parliamentary Union (IPU)
Multilateral Investment Guarantee Agency (MIGA)
Nonaligned Movement (NAM) (guest)
North Atlantic Treaty Organization (NATO)
Nuclear Energy Agency (NEA)
Nuclear Suppliers Group (NSG)
Organisation internationale de la Francophonie (OIF)
Organisation for Economic Co-operation and Development (OECD)
Organization for Security and Cooperation in Europe (OSCE)
Organisation for the Prohibition of Chemical Weapons (OPCW)
Organization of American States (OAS) (observer)
Permanent Court of Arbitration (PCA)
Schengen Convention
Southeast European Cooperative Initiative (SECI)
United Nations (UN)
United Nations Conference on Trade and Development (UNCTAD)
United Nations Educational, Scientific, and Cultural Organization (UNESCO)
United Nations High Commissioner for Refugees (UNHCR)
United Nations Industrial Development Organization (UNIDO)
United Nations Interim Force in Lebanon (UNIFIL)
United Nations Mission for the Referendum in Western Sahara (MINURSO)
United Nations Mission in the Sudan (UNMIS)
United Nations Observer Mission in Georgia (UNOMIG)
Universal Postal Union (UPU)
Western European Union (WEU)
World Customs Organization (WCO)
World Federation of Trade Unions (WFTU)
World Health Organization (WHO)
World Intellectual Property Organization (WIPO)
World Meteorological Organization (WMO)
World Tourism Organization (UNWTO)
World Trade Organization (WTO)
World Veterans Federation
Zangger Committee (ZC)

Law and order in Greece 

Law of Greece
 Capital punishment in Greece
 Constitution of Greece
 Copyright law of Greece
 Greek nationality law
 Life imprisonment in Greece
 Crime in Greece
Human trafficking in Greece
Organized crime in Greece
 Prostitution in Greece
 Terrorism in Greece
 Human rights in Greece
Abortion in Greece
 LGBT rights in Greece
Recognition of same-sex unions in Greece
 Law enforcement in Greece
City Police
Hellenic Gendarmerie
Hellenic Police
Cyber Crime Unit
Special Anti-Terrorist Unit
Units for the Reinstatement of Order

Military of Greece 

Hellenic National Defence General Staff
Military of Greece
 Command
 Commander-in-chief: President of Greece
 Ministry of Defence of Greece
 Forces
 Army of Greece
 Navy of Greece
 Air Force of Greece
 Presidential Guard
 Conscription in Greece
 Greek Army uniforms
 History of the Hellenic Army
Timeline of the Hellenic Army
 Military history of Greece
 Military ranks of Greece
 Structure of the Hellenic Army

Local government in Greece 

Local government in Greece

History of Greece 

History of Greece

By period 

Timeline of Greek history
 Neolithic Greece
 Helladic period
 Ancient Greece
Greek Dark Ages
Archaic Greece
Classical Greece
Hellenistic Greece
 Roman Greece
 Byzantine Greece
 Ottoman Greece
 Modern Greece
Timeline of modern Greek history
 Kingdom of Greece
 Second Hellenic Republic
 Third Hellenic Republic

By subject 

 Economic history of Greece
 History of the Greek alphabet
 Military history of Greece
Military history of Greece during World War II

Culture of Greece 

Culture of Greece
 Architecture of Greece
Castles in Greece
Modern Greek architecture
 Cuisine of Greece
Cretan cuisine
Cuisine of the Ionian islands
Cypriot cuisine
Macedonian cuisine
Greek restaurant
Greek wine
 Greek dress
 Greek nationalism
 Languages of Greece
Greek language question
Modern Greek
Varieties of Modern Greek
Calabrian Greek
Cappadocian Greek
Demotic Greek
Griko dialect
Katharevousa
Mariupol Greek
Pontic Greek
Tsakonian language
 Media in Greece
Newspapers in Greece
Radio in Greece
Television in Greece
 Monuments of Greece
Acropolis of Athens
Ancient Agora of Athens
Ancient Theatre of Epidaurus
Arch of Galerius and Rotunda
Erechtheion
Greek pyramids
Knossos Minoan palace complex
Lion Gate
Odeon of Herodes Atticus
Palaestra at Olympia
Stadium of Delphi
Temple of Hephaestus
Temple of Olympian Zeus, Athens
Terrace of the Lions
Theatre of Dionysus
Tholos of Delphi
 Museums in Greece
 National symbols of Greece
Coat of arms of Greece
Flag of Greece
National anthem of Greece
National colours of Greece
National personification
 People of Greece
Ethnic Minorities in Greece
Names of the Greeks
Greek diaspora
Greeks in Egypt
Greeks in Italy
Immigration to Greece
 Philhellenism
 Public holidays in Greece
Ohi Day
 World Heritage Sites in Greece

Art in Greece 

 Art in Greece
Modern Greek art
Greek academic art of the 19th century
Contemporary Greek art
 Cinema of Greece
 Literature of Greece
Modern Greek literature
List of Greek writers
 Music of Greece
Greek composers
Greek folk music
Music of the Aegean islands
Music of Crete
Music of Cyprus
Music of Epirus
Music of the Heptanese
Ionian School
Music of Macedonia
Music of the Peloponnese
Music of Thessaly
Music of Thrace
 Greek dances
 Greek musical instruments
 Greek National Opera
Greek New Wave
 Theatre in Greece
National Theatre of Greece

Religion in Greece 

Religion in Greece
 Catholic Church in Greece
Archdiocese of Athens
Archdiocese of Rhodos
Archdiocese of Corfù, Zante and Cefalonia
Archdiocese of Naxos, Andros, Tinos and Mykonos
Apostolic Vicariate of Thessaloniki
 Greek Orthodox Church
Church of Greece
Archbishopric of Athens
 Buddhism in Greece
 Hinduism in Greece
 Islam in Greece
 Judaism in Greece
 Protestantism in Greece
 Sikhism in Greece

Sports in Greece 
 

Sports in Greece
 Baseball in Greece
 Basketball in Greece
Greece national basketball team
 Cricket in Greece
 Football in Greece
Greece national football team
List of football clubs in Greece
Football League
Superleague Greece
 Greece at the Olympics
1896 Summer Olympics
2004 Summer Olympics
2004 Summer Olympics opening ceremony
 Greece at the Paralympics
 Hockey in Greece
Ice hockey in Greece
 Rugby in Greece
Rugby union in Greece
Rugby league in Greece
 Sports venues in Greece
Hellinikon Olympic Complex
Karaiskakis Stadium
O.A.C.A. Olympic Indoor Hall
Olympic Stadium (Athens)
Pampeloponnisiako Stadium
Panathenaic Stadium
Pankritio Stadium
Stavros Mavrothalassitis Stadium
Toumba Stadium

Economy and infrastructure of Greece 

Economy of Greece
 Economic rank, by nominal GDP (2007): 27th (twenty-seventh)
 Agriculture in Greece
Laiki agora
 Banking in Greece
List of banks in Greece
Bank of Greece
National Bank of Greece
Capital controls in Greece
 Communications in Greece
 Internet in Greece
 Companies of Greece
 Currency of Greece: Euro (see also: Euro topics)
Former currency: Greek drachma
ISO 4217: EUR
 Economic history of Greece
Greek economic miracle
 Energy in Greece
Renewable energy in Greece
 Maritime industry
Greek shipping
Greek Merchant Marine
 Science and technology
Greek inventions and discoveries
 Tourism in Greece
Visa policy of the Schengen Area
 Transport in Greece
Rapid transit in Greece
Airports in Greece
Ports in Greece
 Rail transport in Greece
History of rail transport in Greece
 Commuter rail
 Urban rail
Athens Metro
Thessaloniki Metro
Tramway systems in Greece
 KTEL
 Roads in Greece
Attiki Odos
Central Greece Motorway
Olympia Odos
 Water supply and sanitation in Greece

Education in Greece 

Education in Greece
 Academic grading in Greece
 Higher education in Greece
 Universities in Greece
Polytechnics
Τechnological Universities-Technological educational institutes
 Vocational education
IEK

Health in Greece 

Healthcare in Greece
 Hospitals in Greece
 Obesity in Greece
 Smoking in Greece

See also 

Index of Greece-related articles
List of Greece-related topics
List of international rankings
Member state of the European Union
Member state of the North Atlantic Treaty Organization
Member state of the United Nations
Outline of ancient Greece
Outline of geography

References

External links

 Government
President of the Hellenic Republic
Prime Minister of the Hellenic Republic
Hellenic Parliament
Greek News Agenda Newsletter
Greece — information and links related to Greece from the ministry of foreign affairs
Greek missions abroad (embassies, consulates, representations)
Foreign missions in Greece
Greek National Tourism Organisation
National Statistical Service of Greece

 Other
Hellenism.Net - Everything about Greece
National Geographic: Greece
Encyclopædia Britannica - Greece's country page
Hellenic History
The Greek Heritage

Chronology of Greece from the World History Database
History of Greece: Primary Documents
Greek Council for Refugees

Greece